Nuwan Priyankara (born 10 December 1976) is a Sri Lankan cricketer. He played four first-class matches for Chilaw Marians Cricket Club in 2001.

See also
 List of Chilaw Marians Cricket Club players

References

External links
 

1976 births
Living people
Sri Lankan cricketers
Chilaw Marians Cricket Club cricketers
Place of birth missing (living people)